Teodor Filipović (1778–1807), Serbian writer, jurist, philosopher and educator, also known by his pseudonym Božidar Grujović.

Biography
Teodor Filipović was born in the town of Ruma in Srem, then part of the Habsburg dynasty, in 1778. He attended schools in Sopron, Segedin, Pozun and studied law at the University of Pest. After graduation, he was appointed professor of law history at the University of Kharkov in Imperial Russia in 1803. In 1804 he took the nom de guerre of Božidar Grujović before leaving his post as a university professor to go to Karađorđe's Serbia to fight the Turks. He was the first secretary of Serbia's Governing Council, and Karađorđe's legal counsellor, who helped establish a centralized constitutional civil government (which lasted until 1813). Another educator, Ivan Jugović, came to take the post of secretary of Karađorđe's Governing State Council after Filipović died in 1807. 
  
After the First Serbian Uprising in 1804, this lawyer from Ruma (then ruled by Austrian Empire), who received his doctor of law degree from the University of Budapest and for a while taught History of Law with his fellow Serbs, law professor Gligorije Trlajić and physicist Atanasije Stojković at the new Imperial Kharkov University (founded by Vasily Karazin and established in 1804 by Emperor Alexander I of Russia), joined his compatriots in Serbia in their fight for independence. The shock of that seizure had salutary results in Serbia, for it called into existence a widespread spirit of patriotism, especially among the youth. Education was fostered, and an enlightened parliament began to prepare a new constitution that should rid the obstructive Turkish ways. Religious toleration and the equality of all citizens before the law were proposed. In Belgrade in 1805 Grujović (Filipović) wrote the Decree of the Governing Council (Praviteljstvujušči sovjet as it was called in Serbian) and Slovo (Speech), a Serbian version of the French Declaration of the Rights of Man and Citizen of 1793. It addressed the many unresolved questions plaguing Serbia and its people (who had enough of Turkish rule), such as issues concerning liberty, property, and human dignity. Grujović stood passionately for legality, rule of law, and social justice. The foundation of his decree (and its laws) was based on democratic and liberal ideas of rationalism and justice. Grujović may also be credited for setting the bed stones of constitutionality during the resurrection of the Serbian state. He is, therefore, justifiably referred to as the first Serbian constitution maker. Grujević's principal stand was that there could be no freedom without economic independence while stressing the importance of education for everyone. He was Dositej Obradović's most ardent supporter when Dositej advocated agricultural development based on the use of modern technology. Filipović was part of a group of Serbian economic thinkers (such as Dositej Obradović, Zaharije Orfelin, Jovan Muškatirović, Ivan Jugović, Pavle Solarić, Emanuilo Janković, Atanasije Stojković, Vićentije Rakić and others) who supported the cameralist principles of rational economic conduct and the development of new sciences and methodologies.

Grujović wrote: Gdi nema slobode, tu nema života (Where there is no freedom; there is no future).

Grujović died of tuberculosis at Belgrade in 1807.

His younger brother, Mihailo Filipović (1780-after 1815), also taught at the University of Kharkov.

See also
 Gligorije Trlajić
 Atanasije Stojković
 Vasily Karazin
 Andrej Dudrovich
 List of Serbian Revolutionaries

References

G. Vukadinović, Shvatanje prirodnog prava Božidara Grujovića [B. Grujović's Notion of Natural Law] in Pola veka nauke i tehnike u obnovljenoj Srbiji 1804–1854 (Kragujevac, 1996), pages 79–83.

1778 births
1807 deaths
People from Ruma
18th-century Serbian lawyers
19th-century Serbian lawyers
Habsburg Serbs